Brillion is a city in Calumet County in the U.S. state of Wisconsin. The population was 3,327 as of July 1, 2019. The city is located within the Town of Brillion, though it is politically independent.

History
Brillion is named after the town of Brilon, in Germany.

Geography

Brillion is located at  (44.175114, −88.0661).

Demographics

2010 census
As of the census of 2010, there were 3,148 people, 1,298 households, and 851 families living in the city. The racial makeup of the city was 97.1% White, 0.2% African American, 0.5% Native American, 0.2% Asian, 0.9% from other races, and 1.2% from two or more races. Hispanic or Latino of any race were 2.8% of the population.

There were 1,298 households, of which 32.8% had children under the age of 18 living with them, 52.7% were married couples living together, 7.8% had a female householder with no husband present, 5.1% had a male householder with no wife present, and 34.4% were non-families. 29.7% of all households were made up of individuals, and 15.7% had someone living alone who was 65 years of age or older. The average household size was 2.42 and the average family size was 3.01.

The median age in the city was 37.8 years. 25.5% of residents were under the age of 18; 7% were between the ages of 18 and 24; 27.1% were from 25 to 44; 24.1% were from 45 to 64; and 16.2% were 65 years of age or older. The gender makeup of the city was 49.4% male and 50.6% female.

2000 census
As of the census of 2000, there were 2,937 people, 1,155 households, and 818 families living in the city. The population density was 1,128.8 people per square mile (436.1/km2). There were 1,230 housing units at an average density of 472.7 per square mile (182.7/km2). The racial makeup of the city was 98.64% White, 0.72% Native American, 0.17% Asian, 0.17% from other races, and 0.31% from two or more races. 0.51% of the population were Hispanic or Latino of any race.

There were 1,155 households, out of which 32.6% had children under the age of 18 living with them, 60.6% were married couples living together, 7.7% had a female householder with no husband present, and 29.1% were non-families. 25.2% of all households were made up of individuals, and 12.3% had someone living alone who was 65 years of age or older. The average household size was 2.53 and the average family size was 3.03.

In the city, the population was spread out, with 26.3% under the age of 18, 8.2% from 18 to 24, 29.1% from 25 to 44, 21.9% from 45 to 64, and 14.6% who were 65 years of age or older. The median age was 36 years. For every 100 females, there were 95.7 males. For every 100 females age 18 and over, there were 93.2 males.

The median income for a household in the city was $46,633, and the median income for a family was $52,989. Males had a median income of $37,106 versus $24,318 for females. The per capita income for the city was $20,754. About 1.6% of families and 2.5% of the population were below the poverty line, including 0.8% of those under age 18 and 7.1% of those age 65 or over.

Education

Brillion High School is the area's high school.

Trinity Lutheran School is a Christian Pre-K–8 school of the Wisconsin Evangelical Lutheran Synod in Brillion.

Images

Notable people

 Charles A. Barnard, Wisconsin State Representative
 Charles R. Barnard, Wisconsin State Representative
 Jill Lajdziak, general manager of General Motors Saturn division
 Isaac N. McComb, Wisconsin State Representative
 Gerald L. Miller, U.S. Marine Corps general
 Victor A. Tiedjens, scientist

References

External links

 City of Brillion
 Sanborn fire insurance maps: 1894 1900 1906 1913

Cities in Wisconsin
Cities in Calumet County, Wisconsin